The Rebujas Rock is a Rock Music Festival which is held every September in the village of San Mateo, Cantabria Spain.

History 
What began in 1997 as a small festival, where local rock groups and groups of traditional music performed and no more than 600 people attended in the first year, is today a reference to national festivals, that attracts more than 9,000 people while maintaining the identity of the beginnings and with it the free admission and free camping. There is no profit motive, and it is organised by the S.C.D. Rebujas.

Since 2002 the Rebujas Rock is held in memory of Gabriel Gutierrez Laguillo.
The year 2009, as the big news came to light a tribute song to the Festival ;"Que No Amanezca", which have worked in the major rock groups throughout the state. Besides being an indelible anthem, serves as an important tool to defend and claim the status of San Mateo as the People to avoid extinction. It is the first musical work that is published throughout the long history of people and leaving fruit to the work of the SCD Rebujas.

Posters 
 1997. The Humera - Atlantica 
 1998. La Fuga - The Humera - Karonte - Entramborrios - Mordor 
 1999. La Fuga - Desastre - The Burla - Entraborrios 
 2000. Porretas - Desastre - Entramborrios 
 2001. Marea - Canallas - Vantroi - Los Perezosos - Desastre
 2002. El Ultimo k Zierre - Silencio Absoluto - Desastre - Apuraos - The Birras - Silencio Absoluto - YaSonSEIS
 2003. Rata Blanca - Ars Amandi - Possesiön - Desastre- Mala Reputaticion - Conocimento Zero 
 2004. Reincidentes - Sublevados - Forrage - Propaganda - Amusia 
 2005. Sugarless - Porretas - Desastre - Los Nadie - Sin KoncienZia 
 2006. Hamlet - Boikot - Estrago - Ars Amandi - Propaganda 
 2007. Los Suaves - Kaotiko - PonchoK - Eslabon - Blind Dogs 
 2008. Barricada - Koma - Desastre- Kloakao
2009. Rosendo - Fe De Ratas - Desastre - King Size Co.
2010. Soziedad Alkoholika - Lendakaris Muertos - Hora Zulu - Desastre - A-Tono
2011. Txarrena - Gatillazo - Bocanada - Desastre - De Entramborrios
2012. Koma - Hora Zulu - Obrint Pas - Desastre - Benito Kamelas - Emboque
2013. El Drogas - Kaotiko - Skunk D.F. - Desastre - A.R.D.E.N - Yelko
2014. Boikot - Obus - Segismundo Toxicomano - Vita Imana - Desastre - Karne Cruda

References

External links 
 Official Website of REBUJAS ROCK

Rock festivals in Spain
Music festivals established in 1997
1997 establishments in Spain